, also known as acute social withdrawal, is total withdrawal from society and seeking  extreme degrees of social isolation and confinement. Hikikomori refers to both the phenomenon in general and the recluses themselves. Hikikomori have been described as loners or "modern-day hermits". Estimates suggest that half a million Japanese youths have become social recluses, as well as more than half a million middle-aged individuals.

Definition
The Japanese Ministry of Health, Labour, and Welfare defines hikikomori as a condition in which the affected individuals refuse to leave their parents' house, do not work or go to school and isolate themselves away from society and family in a single room for a period exceeding six months. The psychiatrist Tamaki Saitō defines hikikomori as "a state that has become a problem by the late twenties, that involves cooping oneself up in one's own home and not participating in society for six months or longer, but that does not seem to have another psychological problem as its principal source".

More recently, researchers have developed more specific criteria to more accurately identify hikikomori. During a diagnostic interview, trained clinicians evaluate for:
 spending most of the day and nearly every day confined to home, 
 marked and persistent avoidance of social situations, and social relationships,      
 social withdrawal symptoms causing significant functional impairment, 
 duration of at least six months, and 
 no apparent physical or mental etiology to account for the social withdrawal symptoms.

The psychiatrist Alan Teo first characterized hikikomori in Japan as modern-day hermits, while the literary and communication scholar Flavio Rizzo similarly described hikikomori as "post-modern hermits" whose solitude stems from ancestral desires for withdrawal.

While the degree of the phenomenon varies on an individual basis, in the most extreme cases, some people remain in isolation for years or even decades.

Hikikomori has been defined by a Japanese expert group as having the following characteristics:
Spending most of the time at home
No interest in going to school or working
Persistence of withdrawal for more than 6 months
Exclusion of schizophrenia, intellectual disability, and bipolar disorder
Exclusion of those who maintain personal relationships (e.g., friendships)

Common traits
While many people feel the pressures of the outside world, Hikikomori react by complete social withdrawal. In some more severe cases, they isolate themselves in their bedrooms for months or years at a time. They usually have few or no friends. In interviews with current or recovering hikikomori, media reports and documentaries have captured the strong levels of psychological distress and angst felt by these individuals.

While hikikomori favor indoor activities, some venture outdoors occasionally. The withdrawal from society usually starts gradually. Affected people may appear unhappy, lose their friends, become insecure and shy, and talk less.

Prevalence
According to Japanese government figures released in 2010, there were at that time 700,000 individuals living as hikikomori within Japan, with an average age of 31. (Population of Japan in 2014 was 127.3 million.) Still, the numbers vary widely among experts. These included the hikikomori who were at that time in their 40s and had spent 20 years in isolation.  This group is generally referred to as the "first-generation hikikomori". There is concern about their reintegration into society in what is known as "the 2030 Problem", when they will be in their 60s and their parents begin to die. Additionally, the government estimates that 1.55 million people are on the verge of becoming hikikomori. Tamaki Saitō, who first coined the phrase, originally estimated that there may be over one million hikikomori in Japan, although this was not based on national survey data. Nonetheless, considering that hikikomori adolescents are hidden away and their parents are often reluctant to talk about the problem, it is extremely difficult to gauge the number accurately.

A 2015 Cabinet Office survey estimated that 541,000 recluses aged 15 to 39 existed. In 2019, another survey showed that there are roughly 613,000 people aged 40 to 64 that fall into the category of "adult hikikomori", which Japan's welfare minister Takumi Nemoto referred to as a "new social issue".

While hikikomori is mostly a Japanese phenomenon, cases have been found in the United States, United Kingdom, Oman, Spain, Italy, India, Sweden, South Korea, and France.

Hypotheses on cause

Developmental and psychiatric conditions
Hikikomori is similar to the social withdrawal exhibited by some people with autism spectrum disorders, a group of developmental disorders that include Asperger syndrome, PDD-NOS and "classic" autism. This has led some psychiatrists to suggest that hikikomori may be affected by autism spectrum disorders and other disorders that affect social integration, but that their disorders are altered from their typical Western presentation because of Japanese sociocultural pressures. Suwa & Hara (2007) discovered that 5 of 27 cases of hikikomori had a high-functioning pervasive developmental disorder (HPDD), and 12 more had other disorders or mental diseases (6 cases of personality disorders, 3 cases of obsessive-compulsive disorder, 2 cases of depression, 1 case of slight intellectual impairment); 10 out of 27 had primary hikikomori. The researchers used a vignette to illustrate the difference between primary hikikomori (without any obvious mental disorder) and hikikomori with HPDD or other disorder. Alan Teo and colleagues conducted detailed diagnostic evaluations of 22 individuals with hikikomori and found that while the majority of cases fulfilled criteria for multiple psychiatric conditions, about 1 in 5 cases were primary hikikomori. To date, however, hikikomori is not included in the DSM-5 (The Diagnostic and Statistical Manual of Mental Disorders), due to insufficient data.

According to Michael Zielenziger's book, Shutting Out the Sun: How Japan Created Its Own Lost Generation, the syndrome is more closely related to posttraumatic stress disorder. The author claimed that the hikikomori interviewed for the book had discovered independent thinking and a sense of self that the current Japanese environment could not accommodate.

The syndrome also closely parallels the terms avoidant personality disorder, schizoid personality disorder, schizotypal personality disorder, agoraphobia or social anxiety disorder (also known as "social phobia").

Social and cultural influence
Sometimes referred to as a social problem in Japanese discourse, hikikomori has a number of possible contributing factors. Alan Teo has summarized a number of potential cultural features that may contribute to its predominance in Japan.  These include tendencies toward conformity and collectivism, overprotective parenting, and particularities of the educational, housing and economic systems.

Acute social withdrawal in Japan appears to affect men and women equally.  However, because of differing social expectations for maturing boys and girls, the most widely reported cases of hikikomori are from middle- and upper-middle-class families; sons, typically their eldest, refuse to leave the home, often after experiencing one or more traumatic episodes of social or academic failure.

In The Anatomy of Dependence, Takeo Doi identifies the symptoms of hikikomori, and explains its prevalence as originating in the Japanese psychological construct of amae (in Freudian terms, "passive object love", typically of the kind between mother and infant). Other Japanese commentators such as academic Shinji Miyadai and novelist Ryū Murakami, have also offered analysis of the hikikomori phenomenon, and find distinct causal relationships with the modern Japanese social conditions of anomie, amae and atrophying paternal influence in nuclear family child pedagogy. Young adults may feel overwhelmed by modern Japanese society, or be unable to fulfill their expected social roles as they have not yet formulated a sense of personal honne and tatemae – one's "true self" and one's "public façade" – necessary to cope with the paradoxes of adulthood.

The dominant nexus of hikikomori centres on the transformation from youth to the responsibilities and expectations of adult life. Indications are that advanced industrialized societies such as modern Japan fail to provide sufficient meaningful transformation rituals for promoting certain susceptible types of youth into mature roles. As do many societies, Japan exerts a great deal of pressure on adolescents to be successful and perpetuate the existing social status quo. A traditionally strong emphasis on complex social conduct, rigid hierarchies and the resulting, potentially intimidating multitude of social expectations, responsibilities and duties in Japanese society contribute to this pressure on young adults. Historically, Confucian teachings de-emphasizing the individual and favouring a conformist stance to ensure social harmony in a rigidly hierarchical society have shaped much of East Asia, possibly explaining the emergence of the hikikomori phenomenon in other East Asian countries.

In general, the prevalence of hikikomori tendencies in Japan may be encouraged and facilitated by three primary factors:

Middle class affluence in a post-industrial society such as Japan allows parents to support and feed an adult child in the home indefinitely. Lower-income families do not have hikikomori children because a socially withdrawing youth is forced to work outside the home.
The inability of Japanese parents to recognize and act upon the youth's slide into isolation; soft parenting; or codependency between mother and son, known as amae in Japanese.
A decade of flat economic indicators and a shaky job market in Japan makes the pre-existing system requiring years of competitive schooling for elite jobs appear like a pointless effort to many.

Role of modern technology 
Although the connection between modern communication technologies (such as the Internet, social media and video games) and the phenomenon is not conclusively established, those technologies are considered at least an exacerbating factor that can deepen and nurture withdrawal. Previous studies of hikikomori in South Korea and Spain found that some of them showed signs of Internet addiction, though researchers do not consider this to be the main issue. However, according to associate professor of psychiatry at Kyushu University in Fukuoka, Takahiro Kato, video games and social media have reduced the amount of time that people spent outside and in social environments that require direct face to face interaction. The emergence of mobile phones and then smartphones may also have deepened the issue, given that people can continue their addiction to gaming and online surfing anywhere, even in bed.

Japanese education system

The Japanese education system, like those found in China, Singapore, India, Pakistan and South Korea, puts great demands upon youth. A multitude of expectations, high emphasis on competition, and the rote memorization of facts and figures for the purpose of passing entrance exams into the next tier of education in what could be termed a rigid pass-or-fail ideology, induce a high level of stress. Echoing the traditional Confucian values of society, the educational system is viewed as playing an important part in society's overall productivity and success.

In this social frame, students often face significant pressure from parents and the society in general to conform to its dictates and doctrines. These doctrines, while part of modern Japanese society, are increasingly being rejected by Japanese youth in varying ways such as hikikomori, freeter, NEET (Not currently engaged in Employment, Education, or Training), and parasite singles. The term "Hodo-Hodo zoku" (the "So-So tribe") applies to younger workers who refuse promotion to minimize stress and maximize free time.

Beginning in the 1960s, the pressure on Japanese youth to succeed began successively earlier in their lives, sometimes starting before pre-school, where even toddlers had to compete through an entrance exam for the privilege of attending one of the best pre-schools. This was said to prepare children for the entrance exam of the best kindergarten, which in turn prepared the child for the entrance exam of the best elementary school, junior high school, high school, and eventually for their university entrance exam. Many adolescents take one year off after high school to study exclusively for the university entrance exam, and are known as ronin. More prestigious universities have more difficult exams. The most prestigious university with the most difficult exam is the University of Tokyo.

Since 1996, the Japanese Ministry of Education has taken steps to address this 'pressure-cooker' educational environment and instill greater creative thought in Japanese youth by significantly relaxing the school schedule from six-day weeks to five-day weeks and dropping two subjects from the daily schedule, with new academic curricula more comparable to Western educational models.  However, Japanese parents are sending their children to private cram schools, known as juku, to 'make up' for lost time.

After graduating from high school or university, Japanese youth also have to face a very difficult job market in Japan, often finding only part-time employment and ending up as freeters with little income, unable to start a family.

Another source of pressure is from their co-students, who may harass and bully (ijime) some students for a variety of reasons, including physical appearance, wealth, or educational or athletic performance. Refusal to participate in society makes hikikomori an extreme subset of a much larger group of younger Japanese that includes freeters.

Impact

Japanese financial burden
Some organizations, such as the non-profit Japanese organization NPO lila have been trying to combat the financial burden the hikikomori phenomenon has had on Japan's economy. The Japanese CD and DVD producer Avex Group produces DVDs of live-action women staring into a camera to help hikikomori learn to cope with eye contact and long spans of human interaction. The goal is to ultimately help hikikomori reintegrate into society by personal choice, thereby realizing an economic contribution and reducing the financial burden on parents or guardians.

"80–50 problem" 
The "80–50 problem" refers to hikikomori children from earlier days now entering their 50s, as their parents on whom they rely, enter their 80s. It was first described in Japanese publications and media in the late 2010s.

In 2019, Japanese psychiatrist Tamaki Saitō held a press briefing at the Foreign Press Center Japan on the subject of hikikomori. In view of their rising age, he recommended practical advice to parents with older hikikomori, such as drawing up a lifetime financial plan for them, so they will be able to get by after the parents are gone. He also recommended that parents should not fear embarrassment or be concerned about appearances as they look at the options, including disability pensions or other forms of public assistance for their children. Tamaki emphasized the urgency and necessity for families in these situations to plan ahead; the Japanese government failed to see the urgency of the problem and demonstrated no motion toward developing substantive policies or systems like special safety nets related to the ageing group of hikikomori.

Treatment programs 
When it comes to psychosocial support, it is hard for therapists to attain direct access to hikikomori; research to find different and effective treatment plans to aid hikikomori has been ongoing. One such treatment plan is focused on the families of hikikomori. Such focus primarily includes educational intervention programs (e.g. lectures, role-play, etc.) that are geared towards reducing any averse stigma that family members have towards psychiatric disorders like hikikomori. These educational programs are derived from other established family support programs, specifically Mental Health First Aid (MHFA) and Community Reinforcement and Family Training (CRAFT). CRAFT specifically trains family members to express positive and functional communication, whereas MHFA provides skills to support hikikomori with depression/suicidal like behaviour. Studies so far that have modified the family unit's behavioral response to a hikikomori has yielded positive results, indicating that family behavior is essential for recovery, however further research is still needed.

Although there has been a primary emphasis on educating family members, there are also therapy programs for the hikikomori themselves to participate in, like exercise therapy. The individual psychotherapy methods that are being stressed in current research are primarily directed towards cultivating self-confidence within the hikikomori. However, studies have delineated that efficacious treatment of hikikomori requires a multifaceted approach rather than the utilization of one individual approach, such as individual psychotherapy or family therapy.

COVID-19 pandemic impact
Based on prior outbreaks (e.g. SARS, MERS, etc.), studies have shown that due to increased loneliness, quarantined individuals have heightened stress-related mental disturbances. Considering that political, social, and/or economical challenges already bring people to express hikikomori-like behavior, researchers theorize that since all the aforementioned factors are by-products of a pandemic, a hikikomori phenomenon may become more common in a post-pandemic world. In fact, people who do experience mental disturbances in Japan generally view seeking the help of a psychiatrist as shameful or a reason for them to be socially shunned. Experts predict an increase in focus on issues such as the mental health problems now affecting youth, and specifically through effective telemedicine services to either the affected individual and/or their respective family unit.

Furthermore, with hikikomori becoming more prevalent amid a pandemic, experts theorize that it will bring out more empathy and constructive attention towards the issue.

See also

 Acedia
 Asociality
 Avolition
 Fushūgaku
 Herbivore men
 Incel
 Recluse literature
 Tokyo!, 2008 movie in three parts, the third part, Shaking Tokyo, shows the life of a hikikomori
 Tang ping
 Welcome to the N.H.K., a Japanese novel, manga, and anime series about a young man who is a hikikomori

References

Notes

Bibliography

Further reading

 
 
 

 Media

External links
 
 
 

Academic pressure in East Asian culture
Demographics of Japan
Economy of Japan
Education in Japan
Japanese family structure
Society of Japan
Japanese words and phrases
Words and phrases describing personality